The Prix Verrière was an annual prize awarded by the Académie française from 1935 to 1949 to support literary creations, with the intent of "promoting French influence abroad, particularly through the actions of catholic missionaries, encouraging their works of education, teaching and charity".

Laureates
 1935 : 
 Collège de la Salle de Buenos Aires
 Mgr Émile Sauvant (vicaire apostolique de Bamako)
 Sœurs de Saint-Joseph-de-l'Apparition
 Sœurs de Saint-Vincent de Paul de Santorin
 Union Missionnaire du Clergé
 1936 : 
 Bénédictines de Madagascar
 Bibliothèque Haïtienne des Frères de Port-au-Prince
 Bibliothèque Sainte-Thérèse de l'Enfant Jésus à Alep
 André Dupeyrat for his work on Papouasie
 R.P. Hilaire for works of siamese education
 R.P. Victor Hostachy (1885-1967) for Une belle mission à Madagascar
 Charles Lagier for L'Orient chrétien
 R.P. Alphonse-Louis Mouly for Île de Pâques, île de mystère
 R.P. René Piacentini (1882-1968) for Le Père Mell
 1937 : 
 Aurore, Université catholique de Shangaï
 R.P. Albert David
 R.P. Roger Dussercle
 Orphelinat Saint-Joseph de Beyrouth
 The works of Sœurs de la Providence de Portieux
 The Sisters of Saint-Vincent de Paul of Santorin
 Religieuses Ursulines de Lutra à Tinos en Grèce
 Gervais Quenard
 1938 : 
 Ad Lucem
 Hôpital Sainte-Marie de Changhaï
 R.P. P. Jacquinot for the creation of neutral zones
 The French Mission in Changhaï
 Armenian Sisters of the Immaculate-Conception
 Œuvre apostolique
 1939 : 
 R.P. du Mas de Paysac (Curate of Tamatave, Madagascar)
 Filles de la Charité de Bitolj (Yugoslavia)
 The Superior of the Hôtel-Dieu de Québec
 Maurice-Hyacinthe Lelong for Le Sahara aux cent visages
 R.P. Yves Pichon for Daniel Brottier
 1940 : 
 Jean-Romain Alléou
 Gustave Charlier for Vue d'Amérique
 R.P. Joseph Delore
 Georges Doutrepont for Histoire illustrée de la langue française en Belgique
 1941 : 
 M. Nguyen-Dac-Khé
 M. Nguyen-Duc-Giang
 M. Tran-Van-Trad
 M. Tran-Van-Tung (1915-....) for Rêves d'un campagnard annamite
 1948 : Louis Marchand
 1949 : Marie-André du Sacré-Cœur (1899-1988) for Sous le ciel d’Afrique

References

French literary awards
1935 establishments in France
Awards established in 1935